Adu Kili is a town in the Federally Administered Tribal Areas of Pakistan. It is located at 33°40'42N 70°27'3E with an altitude of 1636 metres (5370 feet).

References

Populated places in Khyber Pakhtunkhwa